Deliphrum tectum  is a species of rove beetles native to Europe.

References

Staphylinidae
Beetles described in 1789
Beetles of Europe